The Sarajevo Ramadan Festival is an annual religious and cultural festival held in Sarajevo, Bosnia and Herzegovina that celebrates the Islamic holy month of Ramadan. The festival was established in 2014 by the Sarajevo Navigator Foundation and the Zone of Improved Business (ZUP) Baščaršija in cooperation with the European Union's PHOENIX – Culture for the Future project. It is endorsed by the Oriental Institute in Sarajevo. The aim of the festival is the creation of inter-religious dialogue and the promotion of peace, reconciliation and solidarity among faith groups through the presentation of Islamic art and culture.

Format
The festival lasts for the length of Ramadan and is composed of numerous programmes that are held all over the city. Open-air Iftar, the evening meal with which Muslims end their daily Ramadan fast at sunset, open to Muslims and non-Muslims alike, is organized every evening in the Žuta Tabija fortress that overlooks the city. Exhibitions of Islamic art, including calligraphy, paintings, pottery and marquetry are held in the Gazi Husrev-beg Library which also hosts readings of renowned Islamic poetry. A trade fair of book publishers on Islamic art is another of the numerous festival programmes. Interactive lectures, panel discussions and Q&A's on Islamic theology, culture and art are held in the Gazi Husrev-beg Library and the Gazi Husrev-beg Madrasa. Lecturers and speakers have included Grand mufti Husein Kavazović, Islamic art historian Sabiha Al Khemir, German orientalist Stefan Weber and others. Concerts of different Islamic musical styles such as Nasheed, Dhikr or traditional Bosnian Sevdalinka are held in the Sarajevo National Theatre. The opening and closing ceremonies of the festival are held in the Žuta Tabija fortress.

References

Recurring events established in 2014
Tourist attractions in Sarajevo
Annual events in Bosnia and Herzegovina
Religious festivals
Cultural festivals in Bosnia and Herzegovina
Islamic festivals
Ramadan
Festivals in Sarajevo
2014 establishments in Bosnia and Herzegovina